Dick Creith (born 28 August 1938) was a former Grand Prix motorcycle road racer from Bushmills. He competed in only two Grand Prix races during his career, the 1964 and 1965 500cc Ulster Grand Prix. He won the 1965 500cc Ulster Grand Prix. He was also a two-time winner of the North West 200 race in Northern Ireland.

Motorcycle Grand Prix results 

(key) (Races in bold indicate pole position; races in italics indicate fastest lap)

References

1938 births
People from County Antrim
British motorcycle racers
Motorcycle racers from Northern Ireland
500cc World Championship riders
Living people
Place of birth missing (living people)